Liszki  is a village in Kraków County, Lesser Poland Voivodeship, in southern Poland. It is the seat of the gmina (administrative district) called Gmina Liszki.

The village has a population of 1,850.

During the Second World War 30 Polish civilians (including 3 women) were tortured and murdered on July 4, 1943, in Liszki by a troop of German SS.

References

Liszki